Ornistomus is a genus of beetles in the family Cerambycidae, containing the following species:

 Ornistomus bicinctus Thomson, 1864
 Ornistomus simulatrix Clarke, 2012

References

Rhinotragini